In additive number theory, an area of mathematics, the Erdős–Tetali theorem is an existence theorem concerning economical additive bases of every order. More specifically, it states that for every fixed integer , there exists a subset of the natural numbers  satisfying

where  denotes the number of ways that a natural number n can be expressed as the sum of h elements of B.

The theorem is named after Paul Erdős and Prasad V. Tetali, who published it in 1990.

Motivation 
The original motivation for this result is attributed to a problem posed by S. Sidon in 1932 on economical bases. An additive basis  is called economical (or sometimes thin) when it is an additive basis of order h and

for every . In other words, these are additive bases that use as few numbers as possible to represent a given n, and yet represent every natural number. Related concepts include -sequences and the Erdős–Turán conjecture on additive bases.

Sidon's question was whether an economical basis of order 2 exists. A positive answer was given by P. Erdős in 1956, settling the case  of the theorem. Although the general version was believed to be true, no complete proof appeared in the literature before the paper by Erdős and Tetali.

Ideas in the proof 
The proof is an instance of the probabilistic method, and can be divided into three main steps. First, one starts by defining a random sequence  by

where  is some large real constant,  is a fixed integer and n is sufficiently large so that the above formula is well-defined. A detailed discussion on the probability space associated with this type of construction may be found on Halberstam & Roth (1983). Secondly, one then shows that the expected value of the random variable  has the order of log. That is,

Finally, one shows that  almost surely concentrates around its mean. More explicitly:

This is the critical step of the proof. Originally it was dealt with by means of Janson's inequality, a type of concentration inequality for multivariate polynomials. Tao & Vu (2006) present this proof with a more sophisticated two-sided concentration inequality by V. Vu (2000), thus relatively simplifying this step. Alon & Spencer (2016) classify this proof as an instance of the Poisson paradigm.

Relation to the Erdős–Turán conjecture on additive bases 

The original Erdős–Turán conjecture on additive bases states, in its most general form, that if  is an additive basis of order h then

that is,  cannot be bounded. In his 1956 paper, P. Erdős asked whether it could be the case that 

whenever  is an additive basis of order 2. In other words, this is saying that  is not only unbounded, but that no function smaller than log can dominate . In a sense, what is being conjectured is that there are no additive bases substantially more economical than those guaranteed to exist by the Erdős–Tetali theorem.

Further developments

Computable economical bases 
All the known proofs of Erdős–Tetali theorem are, by the nature of the infinite probability space used, non-constructive proofs. However, Kolountzakis (1995) showed the existence of a recursive set  satisfying  such that  takes polynomial time in n to be computed. The question for  remains open.

Economical subbases 
Given an arbitrary additive basis , one can ask whether there exists  such that  is an economical basis.

Growth rates other than log 
Another possible question is whether similar results apply for functions other than log. That is, fixing an integer , for which functions f can we find a subset of the natural numbers  satisfying ? It follows from a result of C. Táfula (2019) that if f is a locally integrable, positive real function satisfying
 , and
then there exists an additive basis  of order h which satisfies . The minimal case  recovers Erdős–Tetali's theorem.

See also 
 Erdős–Fuchs theorem: For any non-zero , there is no set  which satisfies .
 Erdős–Turán conjecture on additive bases: If  is an additive basis of order 2, then .
Waring's problem, the problem of representing numbers as sums of k-powers, for fixed .

References 

 Erdős, P.; Tetali, P. (1990). "Representations of integers as the sum of k terms". Random Structures & Algorithms. 1 (3): 245–261. .
 Halberstam, H.; Roth, K. F. (1983). Sequences. Springer New York. . .
 Alon, N.; Spencer, J. (2016). The probabilistic method (4th ed.). Wiley. . .
 Tao, T.; Vu, V. (2006). Additive combinatorics. Cambridge University Press. . .

Theorems in number theory
Theorems in combinatorics
Additive number theory
Tetali theorem